The Kabul–Kandahar Highway (NH0101) is  long that links Afghanistan's two largest cities, Kabul and Kandahar. It starts from Dashte Barchi in Kabul and passes through Maidan Shar, Saydabad, Ghazni, and Qalat until it reaches Aino Mina in Kandahar. It is currently being rehabilitated at different locations. This highway is a key portion of Afghanistan's national highway system or "National Highway 1". The entire highway between Kabul and Kandahar has no mountain passes but there are many mountains nearby in some places. Approximately 35 percent of Afghanistan's population lives within  of the Kabul to Kandahar portion of the Ring Road.

History

The Kabul–Kandahar Highway is said to have been designed and asphalted in the 1960s by Afghan and American engineers under contracts with the United States International Cooperation Administration. This was a time when the Soviet Union and the United States were spreading their influence in Afghanistan. In those years the highway was mostly used by trucks and buses because private vehicles were very few when compared to the present time. In the 1980s, in addition to trucks and private vehicles, military convoys of the Soviet Union were often seen passing back and forth between Kabul and Kandahar. The highway began deteriorating in the 1990s.

The rebuilding project was overseen by the Louis Berger Group, with assistance in planning and design by Turkish and Indian engineers. Phase one of paving was completed in December 2003 and the highway was opened to traffic. The journey from Kandahar to Kabul generally took travelers 18 hours but, since the rebuilding, has been shortened to roughly 6 hours.

In 2022 the Government of Afghanistan decided to rebuild and repair the highway. Work soon began in different provinces of the country where the highway passes. Construction of a toll plaza began in Kabul Province in late 2022. Another toll plaza is planned to be constructed in Kandahar Province. 

The Dashte Barchi bus terminus provides transport services to the provinces of Maidan Wardak, Bamyan, Ghazni, Daikundi and Ghor. There is another such terminal in Aino Mina in Kandahar, and one in the western end of that city which provides bus services to Lashkar Gah, Zaranj, Farah and Herat. The bus terminals are regulated by Afghanistan's Ministry of Transport and Civil Aviation.

Route

The Kabul–Kandahar Highway starts from Dashte Barchi in the western section of Kabul. It traverses the provinces of Kabul, Maidan Wardak, Ghazni, Zabul, and Kandahar.

Major accidents and security issues
As of early 2004, Taliban fighters continued to harass travelers of the corridor. Afghan guards, soldiers, mercenaries, and workers have been killed along the route. In October 2003, they kidnapped a Turkish contractor, and that December they kidnapped two Indian workers. In February 2004, Taliban rebels shot down a Louis Berger Group helicopter, killing three.

In March 2004, rebels murdered a Turkish engineer and an Afghan guard. Another Turkish engineer and an interpreter were kidnapped. This action prompted the United States to set up small civilian-military teams in three locations along the route. These teams no longer exist.

On May 8, 2016, a major vehicular crash killed at least 73 and injured over 50 people along the Kabul-Kandahar Highway in Moqor District of Ghazni Province. Two buses traveling from Kabul to Kandahar collided with a fuel tanker, causing a fiery inferno. The vehicles were reportedly speeding to avoid ambush by the Taliban. At least 35 persons died in September 2016 when a fuel tanker collided with a passenger bus.

See also
Kandahar–Herat Highway

References

External links

 
 

Transport in Kabul
Kandahar
Roads in Afghanistan